Paul Andrew Marks (born 30 August 1967 in Southampton, Hampshire) is a former English cricketer. Marks was a right-handed batsman who bowled right-arm medium pace.

Marks made his List-A debut for the Hampshire Cricket Board in the 1st Round of the 2001 Cheltenham and Gloucester Trophy against the Kent Cricket Board. Marks final List-A match came in 2nd Round of the 2002 Cheltenham and Gloucester Trophy, which was played in 2001 against Ireland.

External links
Paul Marks at Cricinfo
Paul Marks at CricketArchive

1967 births
Living people
Cricketers from Southampton
English cricketers
Hampshire Cricket Board cricketers